Lance O. Omal (born 30 November 1995), known professionally as Lancey Foux, is a British rapper, singer, songwriter, record producer and model from Stratford, London.

Early life 
Lance O. Omal was born in London to a mother and father of Ugandan descent. He spent most of his childhood growing up in Newham, East London.

Career

2015–2017: Online beginnings and solo debut 
Lancey Foux began his music career in 2015 by freestyling over YouTube beats from his bedroom. In the same year, he released his debut studio album Pink. Two weeks later, he released a single titled “About It”. Later that year, he released his sophomore studio album TEEN SKUM. After two years of releasing singles on SoundCloud, he released a collaborative studio album with English producer Nyge titled First Day at Nursery.

2018: Too Far Alive and Pink II 
By early 2018, Foux started using a different style which he utilized on his album Too Far Alive. Three months later, he released Pink II, the sequel to his debut album, which contained a feature from British rapper Skepta on “Dyed 2WICE”. He soon joined Skepta's SK LEVEL Europe tour.

2019: Friend or Foux 
Foux performed at US hip-hop festival Rolling Loud in 2019 and modelled for Jordan and A-COLD-WALL*, MISBHV, Trapstar, and Naomi Campbell's 2019 Fashion for Relief Gala. He released project, Friend or Foux, on 6 December 2019, which allowed him to sell out his first headline show at O2 Islington, two days later.

2020 
In 2020, months after releasing his project Friend or Foux, Foux cancelled his tour prematurely due to the COVID-19 pandemic. Later in June, he went onto release a pair of singles addressing the Black Lives Matter movement titled TIME FOR WAR !i and RELAX !i.

In December 2020, Lancey Foux released a single, Poison, featuring close friend Bakar.

In January 2021, Lancey Foux released his second single from his upcoming album titled Steelo Flow. One month later, Lancey Foux released another single titled DONT TALK, which was the lead single for his Mixtape FIRST DEGREE.

In November 2021, Omal released a mixtape titled LIVE.EVIL. The project received two features by American rappers Lil Yachty on the third track OUTTAMYMIND! and 24kGoldn on the last track "BIG SWAG" released before the project's release.

In January 2022, Omal modelled for Matthew M Williams's brand 1017 ALYX 9SM in Milan, Italy.

2022 
On October 28, 2022, Lancey Foux released his album Life in Hell.

Personal life 
Omal has been dating British model Leomie Anderson since 2016.

Discography 
Studio albums

Mixtapes

References

External links 
 Official website
 Lancey Foux at YouTube

21st-century British rappers
1995 births
Living people
People from Plaistow, Newham
English male models
English record producers
21st-century English male singers
21st-century English singers
Rappers from London
Black British male rappers
English people of Ugandan descent